The Iris transponder is a small, low power deep-space transponder designed by JPL for use in cubesats.  It unifies a number of communication functions - receiver, command detector, telemetry modulator, exciters, and control functions - into one 1.2-kg package that occupies about 0.5 U.  Iris is designed to handle X band uplink, UHF receive, and both X band and optional Ka band downlink.  It is only one third the mass, and lower power, compared to the smallest previous solution, the Small Deep Space Transponder.

Functions                                                
The capabilities of Iris include:
                                                        
X-band receiver/downconverter capable of carrier tracking.
Command detector unit function.
Telemetry modulation function.
X-band exciter.   
A matching X-band power amplifier and low-noise amplifier.                                 
X-band ranging.
UHF (390-450 MHz) receiver for communication with landers/rovers.
Differential one-way ranging (DOR) at X-band.                                     
Uplink: TC Space Data Link Protocol - CCSDS 232.0-B-3
Downlink: AOS Space Data Link Protocol = CCSDS 732.0-B-3
Supports codes Convolutional 7-1/2, Manchester, Bi-Phase, and bypass (NRZ), Reed Solomon (255,223), Turbo codes with rates 1/2, 1/3, and 1/6 (block size 8920 bits)
Interface to rest of CubeSat electronics is through Serial Peripheral Interface Bus, with a special hardwired output to reset the CubeSat.

Missions
Mars Cube One
Lunar Flashlight
BioSentinel
NEA Scout

See also
Electra (radio)

References

Jet Propulsion Laboratory